Bežovce is a village and municipality in the Sobrance District in the Košice Region of east Slovakia.

History
In historical records the village was first mentioned in 1214.

Geography
The village lies at an altitude of 105 metres and covers an area of 29.507 km².
It has a population of about 1000 people.

Culture
The village has a public library, a gymnasium and a football pitch

Genealogical resources

The records for genealogical research are available at the state archive "Statny Archiv in Presov, Slovakia"

 Roman Catholic church records (births/marriages/deaths): 1789–1899 (parish B)
 Greek Catholic church records (births/marriages/deaths): 1789–1916 (parish A)
 Reformated church records (births/marriages/deaths): 1844–1906 (parish A)

See also
 List of municipalities and towns in Slovakia

External links
http://en.e-obce.sk/obec/bezovce/bezovce.html
https://web.archive.org/web/20071217080336/http://www.statistics.sk/mosmis/eng/run.html
http://www.bezovce.sk
Surnames of living people in Bezovce

Villages and municipalities in Sobrance District